Mundo Frío is a 2002 album by hip hop duo Lito & Polaco. They had collaborations with great artists among them Daddy Yankee, Nicky Jam, Speedy, Voltio, and Wise.

It was nominated for Billboard's Latin Rap Album of the Year but lost to El General Is Back by El General.

Videos were made for Rosando Con Mi Piel, Mundo Frío, and Esta Noche Quiero Darte.
It's the first the Latin Album to be produced by Terry Date and Fat Joe.

Track listing
Intro: Welcome to My World
Bala Loca
Rosando Con Mi Piel (feat Nicky Jam)
Mundo Frío 
No Confío (feat Voltio)
Interlude: MC Teca (diss to MC Ceja)
Eddie Kaneca (diss to Eddie Dee)
Esta Noche Quiero Darte (feat Speedy)
Sábado Gansta 
Que Prendan los Phillies
El Gran Robo (feat Daddy Yankee)
Interlude: Acabado de Recibir (diss to Tempo and Buddha)
Última Vuelta (diss to Tempo)
Interlude: Calsoncillos Cag!@#... (diss to Tempo and Buddha)
Sábado Chilling 
Quiero Sexo (feat. Wise)
Mírate Al Espejo (Bonus)

References

2002 albums
Lito & Polaco albums
Pina Records albums